Schrier is the surname of the following people:
Amy Schrier, founder, publisher and editor-in-chief of the American adventure travel magazine Blue
Fetter Schrier Hoblitzell (1838–1900), American politician and congressman
Fred Schrier (born 1945), American artist, writer, and animator
Harold G. Schrier (1916–1971), United States Marine Corps lieutenant colonel 
Jeffrey Schrier (born 1943), American visual artist
Jos Schrier (born 1960), Dutch Olympic sailor
Kim Schrier (born 1968), American politician and medical doctor 
Matt Schrier, American photographer 
Paul Schrier (born 1970), American actor
Robert William Schrier (born 1936), American nephrologist and the founding editor-in-chief of the magazine Nature Clinical Practice Nephrology

See also
Scherer